Rock St Patrick's is a Gaelic Athletic Association club based near the village of Rock in County Tyrone, Northern Ireland.

The club fields teams at all levels in Gaelic football and participates in Scór and Scór na nÓg competitions.

The club's men's senior team compete in the Tyrone Intermediate Football Championship and the Tyrone ACFL Division 2. The ladies senior team compete in the Tyrone Junior League and Championship.

History

The club has won the Ulster Junior Club Football Championship on three occasions (2007, 2014 and 2016). The club were runners-up in the All-Ireland Junior Club Football Championship finals in Croke Park in 2008 and 2017.
In 2016, the club celebrated its centenary year.

Achievements
 Tyrone Junior Football Championship (5)
 1982, 2007, 2014, 2016, 2019
 Ulster Junior Club Football Championship 
 2007, 2014, 2016
 Tyrone Intermediate Football League (1) 
 2002
 Tyrone Junior Football League (1) 
 1993

Notable players
In 2003, club player Ciaran Gourley was a member of the first Tyrone GAA team to win the All-Ireland Senior Football Championship, as well repeating this success in 2005 and 2008.

References

External links
 Rock St Patrick's GAA

Gaelic games clubs in County Tyrone
Gaelic football clubs in County Tyrone